Glory to Us, Death to the Enemy is a 1914 short film directed by Yevgeni Bauer.

Plot 

The film tells about the sister of mercy, who, together with her fiancé, goes to war.

A military and patriotic drama set during World War I. At the beginning of the film, the secular life and engagement of the main character Olga to the officer is shown. Then the war begins, and her fiancé is drafted to the front. Olga becomes a nurse of mercy in a hospital and one day sees her beloved among the wounded. He dies in her arms, Olga vows revenge. She asks to join a reconnaissance unit and begins working in a German hospital. One day, she steals an important document and hands it over to the Russian military headquarters. At the end of the film, Olga is awarded a medal.

Starring 
 Ivan Mozzhukhin as Her groom, officer
 Dora Tschitorina as Charity Sister

References

External links 
 

1914 films
1910s Russian-language films
Russian silent films
Russian black-and-white films
Films of the Russian Empire